Vivekodayam Boys Higher Secondary School (V.B.H.S.S) is an aided school in Naikkanal, near Thrissur Town, Kerala, India. The school was established by Vivekodayam Samajom under the leadership of Rama Varma Appan Thampuran in 1917. Now, Adv. Therambil Ramakrishnan is the manager of the school.

History
The school was founded by the inspiration of Swami Vivekananda. A group of devout youths of Thrissur founded an organization called the Vivekodayam Samajom in 1917 for the reminiscence of Vivekananda. They founded a primary school named Vivekodayam school to realize the mission of the Samajom. Later the school was bifurcated into two high schools for boys and girls. On 14 October 1927, Mahatma Gandhi visited this school and wrote his comments in the visitors' book of the school. The luminaries of the school, like Swami Chinmayananda, the founder of Chinmaya Mission and Swami Ranganathananda, the President of Ramakrishna Math have expressed their indebtedness to this school for shaping their destiny.

Famous alumni
Swami Chinmayananda 
Swami Ranganathananda
Malavika Nair
Sathish Kalathil
N. N. Kakkad
V M Sudheeran
Trichur V. Ramachandran
M. R. Chandrasekharan, Professor 
Sundar Menon

References

External links
 Official website
 Calendar of Vivekodayam

Private schools in Kerala
Schools in Thrissur district
High schools and secondary schools in Kerala